Laura Miller is a Scottish broadcast journalist and television presenter, who has presented the Monday to Wednesday night edition of BBC Scotland's Reporting Scotland since 2019. She has also presented The Nine on Friday nights since early 2019. Miller previously worked for STV News, presenting the East Central Scotland edition of STV News at Six.

Early life and education 
Miller grew up in Milton of Campsie in East Dunbartonshire and was educated at Kilsyth Academy. She attended the University of Glasgow from 1998 to 2002, graduating with a Bachelor of Laws (LLB) in Scots Law & French. In 2007, she earned a Master of Arts (MA) with Distinction in Broadcast Journalism from the University College Falmouth in Cornwall, England.

Career 
After graduating from Falmouth University, Miller produced an award-winning documentary on the 2004 Asian tsunami reconstruction in Thailand and secured BJTC Young Journalist of the Year. She joined STV News in December 2007, originally as a reporter and producer. Miller later presented the East Central Scotland edition of STV News at Six. She took maternity leave in May 2016, replaced by Lucy Whyte acting as STV News at Six presenter in the East region. She returned to the Edinburgh newsdesk on 15 May 2017.

In 2018, Miller made a small credited appearance in Avengers: Infinity War, where she played a news reporter who was reporting on an alien attack on New York.

In 2018, Miller left STV and joined BBC Scotland serving as the Consumer Affairs correspondent. In February 2019, she became a presenter on the BBC's The Nine, presenting the Friday night edition alongside John Beattie.

In April 2019, Jackie Bird stood down as a presenter on the BBC's Reporting Scotland programme. In October, Miller was announced as the replacement of Bird as a main presenter, after she was chosen over rival candidates; Catriona Shearer, Amy Irons and Laura Goodwin. She fronts the programme Monday to Wednesday.

Personal life 
Miller lives in Edinburgh with her husband, a school teacher, and their daughter.

References

External links

Year of birth missing (living people)
Living people
Scottish women television presenters
Scottish women journalists
STV News newsreaders and journalists
BBC newsreaders and journalists